DMCM (methyl 6,7-dimethoxy-4-ethyl-β-carboline-3-carboxylate) is a drug from the β-carboline family. It acts as a negative allosteric modulator of GABAA receptors, meaning that it causes the opposite effects to the benzodiazepine class of drugs. As such, DMCM has anxiogenic and convulsant properties, and is used in scientific research to induce anxiety so that new anxiolytic medications can be tested, and to produce convulsions so that anticonvulsant medications can be tested. It has also been shown to produce analgesic effects in animals, thought to be because it produces panic which reduces the perception of pain.

See also
 GABAA receptor negative allosteric modulator
 GABAA receptor § Ligands

References

Anxiogenics
Beta-Carbolines
Carboxylate esters
Convulsants
GABAA receptor negative allosteric modulators
Phenol ethers
Methyl esters